Florence Jany-Catrice (born 1964) is a French economist, specializing in the study of employment, and economic indicators (or new indicators of wealth). She is a professor at the University of Lille and a researcher at the Lille Center for Sociological and Economic Studies and Research (CLERSE-CNRS).

In 2015, she was awarded the Legion of Honor.

Life 
She studied economics at the University of Lille, the College of Europe, and Johns-Hopkins University.

In 1992, she was appointed lecturer, and then professor of economics at the University of Lille. She conducted research at Clersé (Lillois Center for Economic and Sociological Studies and Research)-UMR 8019, around economy indicators (work, employment, services, wealth).

She chairs the French Association of Political Economy. She is also a visiting professor at Xi'An University.

Her work appeared in Le Monde.

She is on the editorial board of the journal Socio-économie du travail (Economies and societies); she is director and member of the editorial board of the Revue française de socio-économie (RFSE), which she co-founded with Bernard Convert and Richard Sobell. She is co-chair with Jean Gadrey of the Forum for Other Wealth Indicators founded in 2008 initially to monitor the activities of the Commission on the Measurement of Economic Performance and Social Progress.

From 2008 to September 2017, she was the director of the Revue française de socio-économie.

Works 

 La Performance totale : nouvel esprit du capitalisme?, éditions Presses Universitaires du Septentrion, 2012
 (with François-Xavier Devetter et Thierry Ribault), Les Services à la personne, éditions La Découverte, 123 p., 2009
 « Les services à la personne : la double inégalité », in Louis Maurin, Patrick Savidan (eds), L’État des inégalités en France, éditions Belin, 2008
 (with Stephan Kampelmann), « L'indicateur de bien-être économique : une application à la France », Revue française d'économie, 2007
 (with Jean Gadrey), Les Nouveaux Indicateurs de richesse, éditions La Découverte, 123 p. 
   
 « Une analyse socioéconomique de l'emploi dans l'hôtellerie-restauration en France et aux États-unis », Économies et sociétés, series "Socio-économie du travail", AB n° 23 (1), 2004
 (with Dominique Méda, Bernard Perret and Andrew Sharpe), « Débat sur l'indice du bien-être économique », Travail et emploi, n° 93, 2003

References 

1964 births

Living people
Recipients of the Legion of Honour
21st-century French economists
French women economists
University of Lille Nord de France alumni
Academic staff of the University of Lille Nord de France
College of Europe alumni
Johns Hopkins University alumni